Maggie's centres are a network of drop-in centres across the United Kingdom and Hong Kong, which aim to help anyone who has been affected by cancer.  They are not intended as a replacement for conventional cancer therapy, but as a caring environment that can provide support, information and practical advice.  They are located near, but are detached from, existing NHS hospitals.

The Scottish registered charity (registration number SC024414) which promotes, builds and runs the centres is formally named the Maggie Keswick Jencks Cancer Caring Trust, but refers to itself simply as Maggie's. It was founded by and named after the late Maggie Keswick Jencks, who died of cancer in 1995. Like her husband, architectural writer and critic Charles Jencks, she believed in the ability of buildings to uplift people. The buildings that house the centres have been designed by leading architects, including Frank Gehry, Zaha Hadid and Richard Rogers.

Patrons of the charity include Frank Gehry, Jon Snow, Kirsty Wark, and Sarah Brown, wife of former British prime minister Gordon Brown. The charity's chief executive officer is Laura Lee, who was Maggie's cancer nurse. The President of the charity is Camilla, Duchess of Cornwall.

Locations

Edinburgh

The first Maggie's Centre opened in Edinburgh in 1996, and is located within the Western General Hospital on Crewe Road. The centre is housed in a converted stable block. The conversion, designed by Richard Murphy, was nominated for the 1997 Stirling Prize. The centre was extended, again by Murphy, in 1999.

Glasgow

Glasgow's first Maggie's Centre opened in 2002 and was located at the Western Infirmary on Dumbarton Road, near the Kelvingrove Museum. The centre was housed in a former gatehouse lodge of the University of Glasgow, renovated and altered by Page\Park Architects. Charles Jencks designed the landscaping around the site, and contributed a DNA sculpture for the garden.  In 2011 a new facility opened at Gartnavel, having been designed by OMA, led by Dutch architect Rem Koolhaas and Ellen van Loon.

Dundee

Frank Gehry's first building in the United Kingdom was the Maggie's Centre at Dundee. The centre opened in September 2003 at Ninewells Hospital. Gehry's design was named "Building of the Year" by the Royal Fine Art Commission for Scotland, and was also nominated for the 2004 RIAS Andrew Doolan Award for Architecture.

Highlands
The Maggie's Centre in Inverness, Highland, is at Raigmore Hospital, and was designed by David Page of Page\Park Architects. Landscape design and sculptures were again the work of Charles Jencks. The building opened in 2005, and won the 2006 RIAS Andrew Doolan Award for Architecture.

Fife

The Maggie's Centre in Kirkcaldy, Fife, opened in November 2006 at the Victoria Hospital. The building was designed by Zaha Hadid, and is her first built work in the UK. In the building there is emphasis placed on the transition between the natural and the man-made, and on the period between the hospital and home; the transition after having undergone treatment. There was an emphasis on clear and translucent glass, with powerfully sculptural cantilevers. The entrance facade is almost entirely made from glass. On the north side, the roof extension protects the entrance, while to the south, it provides shade. This can be seen as a fusion between form and function. Much thought has gone into the layout of the building, with the kitchen as the centre of the building and an informal atmosphere.

London

The Maggie's Centre in London is located at Charing Cross Hospital, West London. Opened in April 2008, the centre was designed by Rogers Stirk Harbour + Partners and was the first purpose-built Maggie's Centre in England. Dan Pearson designed the garden around the centre.
In May 2009 the centre won a RIBA award for architectural excellence and was named as London Project of the Year. On 17 October 2009 Richard Rogers and his team at Rogers Stirk Harbour + Partners were awarded the Stirling Prize for the building, and subsequently donated the £20,000 prize money to the cancer care centre.

Cheltenham
Maggie's Cheltenham, beside Cheltenham General Hospital, was opened by Camilla, Duchess of Cornwall in October 2010. The centre was designed by Sir Richard MacCormac of MJP Architects, and the landscaping by Dr Christine Facer.

Nottingham

Completed in 2011 Piers Gough's building for Nottingham's Maggies offers a "light, peaceful and non-institutional design (to) be a sanctuary for all those who walk through the door. Sheltered by trees, the centre (is) a homely, comfortable space next to the busy hospital, where anyone affected by cancer can come to relax. The centre is a safe space where visitors can engage with nature while being sheltered from the elements. From the outside the playful appearance entice(s) people to take a look through the door; once they do the harmony of light and space will create a uniquely welcoming environment." The interior was designed by fashion designer Paul Smith, who grew up in Nottingham.

Swansea
Maggie's South West Wales Centre at Singleton Hospital in Swansea was designed by the late Japanese Architect Kisho Kurokawa shortly before his death in 2007. The centre was opened in December 2011 by First Minister Carwyn Jones in the presence of guests of honour, Japanese ambassador to the UK Keiichi Hayashi, the family of architect Kisho Kurokawa, and Welsh footballer John Hartson.

Newcastle
Maggie's Newcastle is located at Freeman Hospital, a short walk from the Northern Centre for Cancer Care (NCCC) and was designed by RIBA Royal Gold Medallist, Ted Cullinan of Edward Cullinan Architects.

Hong Kong

Maggie's Cancer Caring Centre opened in a permanent location at Tuen Mun Hospital in March 2013, after operating from an interim site since 2008. The premises were designed by Frank Gehry and comprise the programme building surrounded by a tranquil outdoor environment.

Lanarkshire
Maggie's Lanarkshire opened in 2014 at Monklands Hospital, Airdrie and was designed by Reiach and Hall Architects of Edinburgh.

Oxford

Maggie's Oxford opened in 2014 at Churchill Hospital, Oxford

Aberdeen

Maggie's Aberdeen was designed by Norwegian architects Snøhetta at Aberdeen Royal Infirmary, Aberdeen and opened in 2013.

Manchester
Maggie's Manchester was designed by Foster and Partners and opened in April 2016.

Cardiff
Plans for Wales' second Maggie's Centre, for the Velindre Cancer Centre site in Cardiff, were revealed in 2014. The design was by Dow Jones Architects. Funding of £850,000 was made available by the Wales Government in 2017 to begin work on an interim Centre. The centre was officially opened by the Duchess of Cornwall on 4 July 2019.

Merseyside

On 5 February 2018 it was announced that two new Maggie's Centres at the Clatterbridge Cancer Centre on the Wirral and the Royal Liverpool Hospital in the City Centre would be built as part of a joint project with the Steve Morgan Foundation.

Leeds

Maggie's Leeds was designed by Heatherwick Studio, opened in June 2020, and forms part of the city's St James's University Hospital.

Media coverage
Christian Voice has been criticised for its role in causing Maggie's Centres to decline a four-figure donation from the proceeds of a special performance of Jerry Springer: The Opera. The charity had been due to receive £10 per ticket for an afternoon gala but declined the donation after CV had threatened to picket their centres.

See also 
 Cancer in the United Kingdom

References

External links

 

Buildings and structures in Dundee
Buildings and structures in Edinburgh
Buildings and structures in Glasgow
Buildings and structures in Fife
Buildings and structures in Inverness
Buildings and structures in the London Borough of Hammersmith and Fulham
Charities based in Edinburgh
Cancer organisations based in the United Kingdom
Palliative care in Scotland
Frank Gehry buildings
Zaha Hadid buildings
Palliative care in England